Gaëtan Belaud (born 16 September 1986) is a French former professional footballer who played as a right-back.

References

External links
 
 
 Gaetan Belaud career stats at FranceFootball 

1986 births
Living people
People from Oloron-Sainte-Marie
Sportspeople from Pyrénées-Atlantiques
Association football midfielders
French footballers
En Avant Guingamp players
Paris FC players
Rodez AF players
Tours FC players
Stade Brestois 29 players
Ligue 1 players
Ligue 2 players
Championnat National players
Footballers from Nouvelle-Aquitaine